Kodiak (Alutiiq:), formerly Paul's Harbor, is the main city and one of seven communities on Kodiak Island in Kodiak Island Borough, Alaska. All commercial transportation between the island's communities and the outside world goes through this city via ferryboat or airline. As of the 2020 census, the population of the city is 5,581, down from 6,130 in 2010. It is the tenth-largest city in Alaska.

Originally inhabited by Alutiiq natives for over 7,000 years, the city was settled in the 18th century by the subjects of the Russian crown and became the capital of Russian Alaska. Russian harvesting of the area's sea otter pelts led to the near extinction of the animal in the following century and led to wars with and enslavement of the natives for over 150 years. The city has experienced two natural disasters in the last century: a volcanic ashfall from the 1912 eruption of Novarupta and a tsunami from the 1964 Alaska earthquake.

After the Alaska Purchase by the United States in 1867, Kodiak became a commercial fishing center which continues to be the mainstay of its economy. A lesser economic influence includes tourism, mainly by those seeking outdoor adventure trips. Salmon, halibut, the unique Kodiak bear, elk, Sitka deer (black tail), and mountain goats attract hunting tourists as well as fishermen to the Kodiak Archipelago. The Alaska Department of Fish and Game maintains an office in the city and a website to help hunters and fishermen obtain the proper permits and learn about the laws specific to the Kodiak area.

The city has four public elementary schools, a middle and high school, as well as a branch of the University of Alaska. An antenna farm at the summit of Pillar Mountain above the city historically provided communication with the outside world before fiber optic cable was run. Transportation to and from the island is provided by ferry service on the Alaska Marine Highway as well as local commercial airlines.

History

Indigenous peoples
Archaeological evidence suggests that the Kodiak Archipelago has been home to the Alutiiq for at least 7,000 years. In their language, qikertaq means "island".

Russian control: 1700s–1867

The first Europeans to sight Kodiak Island were the explorers Vitus Bering and Aleksei Chirikov, during the 1741 Second Kamchatka Expedition. In the early 1750s the Russian fur trading merchant and explorer Stepan Glotov met a Kodiak Islander in the Aleutian Islands, who told him about the island. On his next voyage Glotov sailed to Kodiak Island, arriving in 1763. The Russians called the island Kad’yak, after the Alutiiq word qikertaq. Several other Russians made fur hunting voyages to Kodiak Island in the 1770s.  In 1778 the British captain James Cook explored the area and wrote of "Kodiak" in his journals. In 1779 the Spanish explorers Arteaga y Bazán and Bodega y Quadra reached Afognak in the Kodiak Archipelago.
 
In 1792, the Russian Shelikhov-Golikov Company chief manager Alexander Baranov moved the post at Three Saints Bay (established in 1784) to a new site in Paul's Harbor (Svyato-Pavlovskoy Gavani). This developed as the nucleus of modern Kodiak. Baranov considered Three Saints Bay a poor location because it was too indefensible. The relocated settlement was first named Pavlovskaya Gavan ( – Paul's Harbor).

A warehouse was built in what became one of the key posts of the Shelikhov-Golikov Company, a precursor of the Russian-American Company and a center for harvesting the area's vast population of sea otters for their prized pelts. The warehouse still stands as the Baranov Museum. Because the First Native cultures revered this animal and would never harm it, the Russians had wars with and enslaved the Aleuts during this era.

Eastern Orthodox missionaries settled on the island by the end of the 18th century, continuing European settlement of the island. They held the liturgy in native Tlingit from 1800.

The capital of Russian America was moved to Novoarkhangelsk (modern-day Sitka) in 1804. The Russian-American Company was established in 1799 as a joint-stock company by decree of Emperor Paul to continue the harvest of sea otter and other fur-bearing animals and establish permanent settlements. By the mid-19th century, the sea otter was almost extinct and 85% of the First Native population had disappeared from exposure to European diseases and violence.

American control: 1867–present
When Russia sold Alaska to the United States in 1867, Kodiak developed as a center for commercial fishing, and canneries dotted the island in the early 20th century until global farm-raised salmon eliminated these businesses. New processing centers emerged and the industry continues to evolve. During the presidency of Theodore Roosevelt, animals such as the mountain goat, Sitka deer (black tail), rabbits, muskrats, beavers, squirrels, and others were introduced to the island and the Kodiak National Wildlife Refuge was created.

Kodiak was severely impacted by the 1912 eruption of Novarupta. Townspeople sheltered in the U.S. Revenue Cutter Manning which was docked nearby.

As Kodiak was incorporated in 1941, the U.S. feared attack from Japanese during World War II, and turned the town into a fortress. Roads, the airport, Fort Abercrombie, and gun fortifications improved the island's infrastructure. When Alaska became a state in 1959, government assistance in housing, transportation, and education added additional benefits.

In March 1964, a tectonic tsunami struck the city during the 1964 Alaska earthquake with  waves that killed 15 people and caused $11 million in damage. It wiped out the neighboring Native villages of Old Harbor and Kaguyak. The Standard Oil Company, the Alaskan King Crab Company, and much of the fishing fleet were also destroyed.

Geography
Kodiak is located on the eastern shore of Kodiak Island.

Climate
Kodiak has a humid continental climate (Dfb) with cold winters and mild summers. Precipitation is heavy year-round, though markedly less in the summer months, when the Aleutian Low is at its weakest.

Demographics

Kodiak first appeared on the 1880 U.S. Census as the village of Saint Paul (not to be confused with the city of St. Paul located in the Aleutian Islands). It reported a population of 288, of which 253 were Alaskan Creoles (a mixture of Russian and Native Alaskans), 20 Whites and 15 Aleuts. In 1890, it would report as "Kadiak" (the then-spelling). In 1900, it returned as "Kadiak Settlement." From 1910 onwards, it reported as Kodiak, and would formally incorporate in 1940.

As of the census of 2000, there were 6,334 people, 1,996 households, and 1,361 families residing in the city.  The population density was 706.8/km2 (1,832.7/mi2).  There were 2,255 housing units at an average density of 251.6 persons/km2 (652.5 persons/mi2).  The racial makeup of the city was 46.4% White, 0.7% African American, 10.5% Native American, 31.7% Asian, 0.9% Pacific Islander, 4.4% from other races, and 5.4% from two or more races.  8.5% of the population were Hispanic or Latino of any race. At the 2020 Census, the population had declined to 5,581.

There were 1,996 households, out of which 40.2% had children under the age of 18 living with them, 52.1% were married couples living together, 10.3% had a woman whose husband does not live with her, and 31.8% were non-families. 24.2% of all households were made up of individuals, and 5.4% had someone living alone who was 65 years of age or older.  The average household size was 3.10 and the average family size was 3.64.

In the city, the population was spread out, with 29.1% under the age of 18, 8.7% from 18 to 24, 32.2% from 25 to 44, 23.1% from 45 to 64, and 6.8% who were 65 years of age or older.  The median age was 34 years.  For every 100 females, there were 114.3 males.  For every 100 females age 18 and over, there were 120.6 males.

The median income for a household in the city was $55,142, and the median income for a family was $60,484. Males had a median income of $37,074 versus $30,049 for females. The per capita income for the city was $21,522.  7.4% of the population and 3.7% of families were below the poverty line.  Out of the total people living in poverty, 8.4% were under the age of 18 and 0.0% were 65 or older.

Kodiak is also home for a sizable community of Russian Orthodox Old Believers.

Economy
Among the companies based in Kodiak is Koniag, Incorporated.

Alaska Department of Fish and Game
Kodiak is an important environmental asset which affects the fishing industry, particularly salmon fishing. Its wild game is coveted by hunters worldwide for the Kodiak bear and other game animals; there are strict laws governing fishing and hunting activities as well as hiking near spawning streams. Both the Department and the city maintain websites and publish brochures to help communicate these strictly enforced laws. All of the city's hotels and businesses have these materials in prominent areas for guests, and licenses can be purchased in the city's main sporting goods store and online.

Military installations
The United States Navy operates a small training base near the city called Naval Special Warfare Cold Weather Detachment Kodiak which trains United States Navy SEALs in cold weather survival and advanced tactics.

The United States Coast Guard has a major presence in Kodiak, Alaska.
USCG SUPRTCN Kodiak -  U.S. Coast Guard Support Center Kodiak
 USCG Air Station Kodiak
 
 
 
 Aids to Navigation Team Kodiak
 Communication Detachment Kodiak
 North Pacific Regional Fisheries Training Center (NPRFTC)
 Marine Safety Detachment Kodiak
 Naval Engineering Support Unit (NESU) Detachment Kodiak
 Electronic Systems Support Detachment Kodiak (ESD)

Community events

The city of Kodiak is home to a number of annual events that draw locals and people from off-island. The most well-known of these is Kodiak Crab Festival. Organized by the Kodiak Chamber of Commerce, the event takes place over Memorial Day weekend. It includes a county fair-style main event, with carnival rides, food and game booths, and group activities. In addition, a number of events are organized over the three-day weekend that include a kayak race, a marathon, an ultra-marathon, a  mountain run called the Pillar Mountain Run and others.

The official Pardoning of the Crab was added to The Kodiak Crab Fest in 2019. A crab is given a crab themed name, and then saved from the crab pot by a special guest, and then goes to live at the Kodiak Fisheries Research Center Aquarium.

2019: Sheldon, pardoned by US Senator Dan Sullivan (R-AK).2020: Unknown. 2021: Lenny Crabitz, pardoned by Kodiak City Manager Mike Tvenge.

Education
The Kodiak Island Borough School District operates four elementary schools, one middle school and one high school (Kodiak High School) serving the town of Kodiak and the immediate area surrounding the city of Kodiak. A further 6 schools serve rural sites in the district and are operated as k-12 schools.

The city is home to Kodiak College, a satellite campus of the University of Alaska Anchorage. Within the public school district, there are eight rural schools.

Kodiak is also home to Saint Herman's Orthodox Theological Seminary, a theological school founded in 1972 under the auspices of the Orthodox Church in America. Students from villages all over southern and southwestern Alaska study at St. Herman's in order to become readers or clergy in the Orthodox Church.

Media
KMXT (100.1 FM) the community public radio station
KVOK-FM (101.1 FM) commercial radio station
KVOK (560 AM and 98.7 FM) country radio station and home of Kodiak Bears athletics
Kodiak Daily Mirror (Monday through Friday newspaper)

Transportation

Kodiak Airport attracts both local and regional airlines, air taxis, and charter floatplanes and helicopters which provide transportation to residents and tourists traveling on and off the island. The Alaska Marine Highway provides further transportation via two ferries, MV Tustumena and MV Kennicott. These ships can carry 211 and 748 passengers, respectively, and serve routes between Kodiak, Homer, and Whittier, although the ferry system no longer takes passengers to Seward. Floatplane and bush plane companies regularly take tourists to remote areas and wilderness lodges both on the various islands of the Kodiak Archipelago and the Katmai coast for bear viewing, hunting, and hikes. The city business community also has a fleet of privately owned taxis as well as kayaks, mountain bikes, and all-terrain vehicles (ATVs) for rent.

Health care
Kodiak is primarily served by Providence Kodiak Island Medical Center, the only true hospital medical center on Kodiak Island. Individuals located in the smaller surrounding communities are often airlifted into the hospital via helicopter or air ambulance due to remoteness and nonexistent or poor road connections. The city of Kodiak and these smaller communities are also served by volunteer EMT workers and local clinics.

Energy
Most electrical energy for the city is provided from the Terror Lake Hydroelectric Generating Station owned by the Kodiak Electrical Association. Substantial amounts of energy are also provided by wind turbines and by diesel generators. There are six wind turbines that supply up to 1.5 MW each and have a blade length of 38.5 meters and overall height of 118.5 meters.

In popular culture
In 2012, rapper Pitbull was involved in an advertising campaign with Walmart, in which the Walmart store that gets the most Facebook "likes" from June 18 to July 15, 2012 would have Pitbull visit and put on a show there. An orchestrated internet campaign urged people to vote for the most remote location imaginable, Kodiak, resulting in a sizable lead for that store. Walmart confirmed that Kodiak won. Pitbull visited on July 30 where he received a key to the city from mayor Branson and then made an appearance before a crowd of hundreds at the Coast Guard base.

The Weather Channel docu-series Coast Guard Alaska follows the lives of Coast Guard members stationed in Kodiak.

Czech carmaker Škoda Auto named their new SUV the Škoda Kodiaq, after the Alaskan brown bear, and in tribute Kodiak was renamed Kodiaq for one day (May 6, 2016). In a spelling change also intended to honor the indigenous Alutiiq, the city was renamed with a number of signs changed across town, including the port facilities and city limits. The letter ‘Q’ is a common ending for nouns in the Alutiiq language.

References

External links

 

 
Cities in Alaska
Cities in Kodiak Island Borough, Alaska
Micropolitan areas of Alaska
Populated coastal places in Alaska on the Pacific Ocean
Populated places established in 1791
Populated places in Russian America